Vaura is an American experimental band from Brooklyn, New York, United States, formed in 2009 by singer, guitarist and primary songwriter Joshua Strachan and featuring Kevin Hufnagel (Dysrhythmia,  Gorguts) on lead guitar, Toby Driver (Kayo Dot, Maudlin of the Well, Secret Chiefs 3) on bass.

Vaura's debut album, Selenelion, was released on Wierd Records in February 2011. Stereogum described the record as "a warped, heady strain of metal, one that incorporates bits and pieces of black metal, post-rock, and prog, melting them all into one singular brooding sludge".

The band has toured in support of French group Alcest and has played with Bloody Panda, Sannhet, Deafheaven, Monarch and Castevet.

In early 2013, Vaura was signed to Profound Lore Records. Their sophomore effort, The Missing, was released by the label on November 12, 2013 followed by a third LP in 2019 entitled Sables which was mixed by longtime Scott Walker collaborator Peter Walsh. The Missing was named one of Pitchfork's Best Metal Albums of the Year, while The Wire called Sables "art-pop with an 80s sheen nodding to bands like Japan, The Fixx, and even Discipline-era King Crimson."

Discography

Studio albums
Selenelion (2012, Wierd)
The Missing (2013, Profound Lore)
Sables (2019, Profound Lore)
Vista of Deviant Anatomies (2022, Primal Architecture Records)

References

External links

Musical groups from Brooklyn
American progressive metal musical groups
Heavy metal musical groups from New York (state)
Blackgaze musical groups